The 2011 Hampton Pirates football team represented Hampton University in the 2011 NCAA Division I FCS football season. The Pirates were led by third-year head coach Donovan Rose and played their home games at Armstrong Stadium. They are a member of the Mid-Eastern Athletic Conference. They finished the season 7–4 overall and 5–3 in MEAC play to tie for fourth place.

Schedule

References

Hampton
Hampton Pirates football seasons
Hampton Pirates football